Blanco River is a river located in barrio La Torre in Lares, and also in the municipalities of San Sebastián and Adjuntas, Puerto Rico.

See also
List of rivers of Puerto Rico

References

External links
 USGS Hydrologic Unit Map – Caribbean Region (1974)

Rivers of Puerto Rico